Carol Hamilton (born 1935) was the Oklahoma Poet Laureate from 1995 to 1997.

Biography
Carol Jean Hamilton was born in 1935 in Enid, Oklahoma. She graduated Midwest City High School in 1953, received her bachelor's degree from Phillips University in 1956, and later a master's degree from the University of Central Oklahoma. She taught at Midwest City Del City schools, Rose State College, and the University of Central Oklahoma.  She helped found the Woody Guthrie Poets in 2004.

Her book Once the Dust published by Broncho Press was a 1992 Oklahoma Book Award winner. She was nominated five times for a Pushcart Prize.

See also 

 Poets Laureate of Oklahoma

References

1935 births
Living people
20th-century American poets
American women poets
Poets Laureate of Oklahoma
Writers from Enid, Oklahoma
Phillips University alumni
University of Central Oklahoma alumni
University of Central Oklahoma faculty
20th-century American women writers
American women academics
21st-century American women